Zubenhakrabi (or Zuben Hakrabi) is the traditional name for some stars in the constellation Libra.

It can refer to:
 γ Lib in Bode's small star atlas, Vorstellung der Gestirne.
 η Lib in Burritt's star map.
 ν Lib in Bečvář's star catalogue.
 σ Lib in Bayer's Uranometria.
 υ Lib in a Japanese guide book of the constellations. It is probably a typographical error.

Libra (constellation)
Stars named from the Arabic language